KDDI DESIGNING STUDIO, also known as , is KDDI's consumer showroom in Harajuku.

Overview
KDDI Designing Studio was built on March 4, 2005 in Harajuku. The showroom is 8 minutes walk from Harajuku Station Takeshita Street exit. In 2008, KDDI Designing Studio created , like the one in their commercial, opened to the public from April 26, 2008 to June 3, 2008.

Floors
1F: Loving Lounge
A lounge with free internet and a video advertisement of the newest cell phone model. On some days, there are live events featuring popular musical artists.
2F: au Design Park
Many new cell phone models on display which visitors are free to try out.
3F: KDDI Creation Studio
Some developing software by KDDI is available to try out.
4F: LISMO FOREST
A store just for LISMO goods. (Opened on July 10, 2007) 
5F: WIRED CAFE 360°
An ordinary internet café.

Gallery

References

External links 
 KDDI DESIGNING STUDIO Homepage

KDDI
Commercial buildings completed in 2005
2005 establishments in Japan
Buildings and structures in Shibuya